David M. Van Slyke is an American educator and policy expert on Public Administration, Contracting, and Nonprofit Organization. He is Dean of the Maxwell School of Citizenship and Public Affairs at Syracuse University, which is ranked among the nation's leading school of public and international affairs. He has taught at Syracuse University since 2004 and is an expert on public-private partnerships, public sector contracting and contract management, and policy implementation. He previously served on the faculty at Andrew Young School of Policy Studies at Georgia State University from 1999-2004

Early life
Born in Beacon, New York, Van Slyke first received his undergraduate degree in 1990. For the next 10 years, he worked in both New York state government, private, and nonprofit organizations. He received a master's degree from University at Albany, SUNY and a PhD in Public Administration and Policy from the Rockefeller College of Public Affairs and Policy at University at Albany, SUNY in 2000.

Career

Georgia State University
Van Slyke taught on the faculty at Andrew Young School of Policy Studies in Atlanta from 1999-2004 as an assistant professor, where he was the Director of the Nonprofit Studies Program. Van Slyke's research and teaching focused on nonprofit organizations, philanthropy, Public-Private Partnership, and Contracting. In addition, he worked as a consultant with a variety of community organizations, including the Community Foundation of Greater Atlanta and United Way Worldwide.

Syracuse University
Since 2004, Van Slyke has been a faculty member in the Public Administration and International Relations department at the Maxwell School of Citizenship and Public Affairs at Syracuse University. He is a two-time recipient of the Birkhead-Burkhead Award and Professorship for Teaching Excellence, and is a member of the Campbell Public Affairs Institute. His research on strategic contracting, public-private partnerships, and public administration is highly regarded by both scholars and practitioners in local, state, and federal government. His most recent book coauthored with Trevor Brown and Matthew Potoski, "Complex Contracting: Government Purchasing in the Wake of the U.S. Coast Guard's Deepwater Program" received the Best Book Award in 2014 from the American Society for Public Administration and an Honorable Mention from the Public and Nonprofit Section of the Academy of Management best book award for 2016.

In addition to his scholarship, Van Slyke has traveled globally, working with foreign governments, nonprofit, and business organizations on performance measurement, strategic planning, and executive education. His travels have taken him to five continents. From 2008-2016 Van Slyke served on the faculty of UNU-MERIT as a Non-Resident Visiting Faculty Member. In addition, he has worked with senior government and military officials in the Government Accountability Office, the Office of Management and Budget, the United States Coast Guard, and the World Bank, among many others. He is currently Director and Fellow of the National Academy of Public Administration (United States) and a co-editor of the "Journal of Public Administration Research and Theory" and the "Journal of Strategic Contracting and Negotiation." Van Slyke has also written op-eds and has been featured by media outlets like NPR, The Washington Post, Politico, and The Atlanta Journal-Constitution.

In 2016, Van Slyke was appointed the 10th Dean of the Maxwell School, succeeding James Steinberg. He leads the school of more than 3,000 undergraduate and graduate students in all the social sciences.

In 2020, Van Slyke was appointed to the Defense Business Board by the United States Secretary of Defense Mark Esper.

Honors
 2016 High Table Keynote Speaker, Center for Public Administration and Policy, Virginia Tech
 2015 Distinguished Alumnus in Public Administration and Policy, Rockefeller College of Public Affairs and Policy, University at Albany, SUNY
 Board of Directors, National Academy of Public Administration (United States)
 2014-2018 and 2006-2010 Birkhead-Burkhead Professorship of Teaching Excellence, Maxwell School of Citizenship and Public Affairs

Books
 Complex Contracting: Government Purchasing in the Wake of the U.S. Coast Guard's Deepwater Program, Trevor Brown, Matthew Potoski, and David M. Van Slyke, Cambridge University Press (2013), 
 The Future of Public Administration Around the World: The Minnowbrook Perspective, ed. Rosemary O'Leary, Soonhee Kim, and David M. Van Slyke, Georgetown University Press (2010),

References

External links
David Van Slyke's website at Maxwell School of Citizenship and Public Affairs

Syracuse University faculty
People from Beacon, New York
Living people
University at Albany, SUNY alumni
Georgia State University faculty
1968 births